Nathalie Colin-Oesterlé (born 5 May 1965) is a French lawyer and politician of The Centrists who has been serving as a Member of the European Parliament in 2019.

Political career
Since 2001, Colin-Oesterlé has been a member of the municipal council of Metz.

Since joining the European Parliament in the 2019 elections, Colin-Oesterlé has been serving on the Committee on the Environment, Public Health and Food Safety. She later also joined the Special Committee on Beating Cancer (2020) and the Special Committee on the COVID-19 pandemic (2022). Since 2021, she has been part of the Parliament's delegation to the Conference on the Future of Europe.

In addition to her committee assignments, Colin-Oesterlé is part of the Parliament's delegations for relations to Israel and to the Parliamentary Assembly of the Union for the Mediterranean. She is also a member of the European Parliament Intergroup on Climate Change, Biodiversity and Sustainable Development and the MEPs Against Cancer group.

References

1965 births
Living people
MEPs for France 2019–2024
21st-century women MEPs for France
People from Ollioules
Paris 2 Panthéon-Assas University alumni
Union of Democrats and Independents politicians
Politicians from Grand Est